Rodrigo Agustín Montes (born 3 de abril del 2000) is an Argentine footballer currently playing as a midfielder for Central Córdoba SdE on loan from Boca Juniors.

Career statistics

Club

Notes

References

1999 births
Living people
Footballers from Córdoba, Argentina
Argentine footballers
Association football midfielders
Argentine Primera División players
Boca Juniors footballers
Central Córdoba de Santiago del Estero footballers